Dziamyan Turchyn (alternate listings: Demian Turchin or Demyan Turchin, born 2 March 1985 in Minsk) is a Belarusian sprint canoer.

At the Olympics the only K-4 race is over 1000 m and Reneysky dropped Skurkouski from the 1000 m line-up in favour of Turchyn. Belarus finished sixth in the Olympic final.

In 2006 they began with victories at the Poznan and Duisburg regattas. However Reneysky then changed his strategy in preparation for the 2008 Summer Olympics. With only one K-4 event, the 1000 m, on the Olympic schedule, the K-4 crew would not be entered for the 500m at the European and World Championships. This strategy was logical in that it allowed Piatrushenka and Makhneu the necessary rest time to compete in the K-2 500 m.

At the European Championships in Račice, Czech Republic, Turchyn and his team-mates won a silver medal in the K-4 1000 m behind Slovakia. This was their best-ever result over 1000 m in a major championship. But their background as sprinters was demonstrated the following day as they took gold in the K-4 200 m.

At the 2006 World Championships, held in Szeged, Hungary, the Belarusian four claimed a bronze medal in the 1000 m final (this time behind hosts Hungary and Poland) - their first world championship medal over the Olympic distance.

Turchyn won a gold in the K-4 200 m event at the 2009 championships in Dartmouth.

Turchyn is 190 cm (6'3") tall and weighs 90 kg (198 lbs).

References
 Canoe09.ca profile

External links
 
 

1985 births
Belarusian male canoeists
Canoeists at the 2004 Summer Olympics
Living people
Sportspeople from Minsk
Olympic canoeists of Belarus
ICF Canoe Sprint World Championships medalists in kayak